Ole Edvart Rølvaag (Rølvåg in modern Norwegian, Rolvaag in English orthography) (April 22, 1876 – November 5, 1931) was a Norwegian-American novelist and professor who became well known for his writings regarding the Norwegian American immigrant experience. Ole Rolvaag is most frequently associated with Giants in the Earth, his award-winning, epic novel of Norwegian immigrant homesteaders in Dakota Territory.

Biography
Rølvåg was born in the family's cottage in a small fishing village on the island of Dønna, in Nordland county, Norway. Dønna, one of the largest islands on the northern coast of Norway, is situated about five miles from the Arctic Circle. He was born with the name Ole Edvart Pedersen, one of seven children of Peder Benjamin Jakobsen and Ellerine Pedersdatter Vaag. The settlement where he was born had no official name, but was referred to as Rølvaag, the name of a narrow bay on the northwestern point of the island where the fishermen kept their boats. At 14 years of age Rølvaag joined his father and brothers in the Lofoten fishing grounds. Rølvaag lived there until he was 20 years of age, and the impressions he received during the days of his childhood and his young manhood endured with him throughout his life.

An uncle who had emigrated to America sent him a ticket in the summer of 1896, and he traveled to Union County, South Dakota to work as a farmhand. He settled in Elk Point, South Dakota, working as a farmhand until 1898. With the help of his pastor, Rølvaag enrolled in Augustana Academy in Canton, South Dakota where he graduated in 1901. He earned a bachelor's degree from St. Olaf College in Northfield, Minnesota in 1905, and a master's degree from the same institution in 1910. He also had studied for some time at the University of Oslo.

Career
In 1906, Rølvaag was recruited as a professor by St. Olaf College president John N. Kildahl. Rølvaag was made head of the Norwegian Department at St. Olaf in 1916. In 1925, Ole E. Rolvaag became the first secretary and archivist of Norwegian-American Historical Association. He held both positions for the rest of his life.

Personal life
In 1908, he became a United States citizen and married Jennie Marie Berdahl, the daughter of Andrew James Berdahl and Karen Oline Otterness. They had four children: Olaf, Ella, Karl and Paul. Their son, Karl Fritjof Rolvaag, served as the 31st Governor of Minnesota.
Ole Rolvaag died November 5, 1931, in Northfield, Minnesota.

Literary style and themes
Ole Rølvaag wrote in the Norwegian language, but his novels have a distinct American flavor and theme. Rolvaag was deeply influenced by earlier American writers who, writing in Norwegian, had faithfully portrayed the experiences of so many Norwegian immigrant pioneers. In this he was strongly influenced by Hans Andersen Foss and Peer Stromme, both of whom had written novels which provided realistic aspects of the homesteader's experience. The Emigrants by Norwegian author Johan Bojer, first published in 1925, follows many of these same themes. Rølvaag in turn provided an equally strong influence on future Scandinavian writers. Rølvaag attracted a number of gifted young Norwegian-Americans to St. Olaf College, among them Einar Haugen. Written decades later, Vilhelm Moberg's novels would depict the experience of Swedish-American immigrants.

Giants in the Earth
Rølvaag's authorship and scholarship focused on the pioneer experience on the Dakota plains in the 1870s. His most famous book was Giants in the Earth (Norwegian: I de dage), part of a trilogy. It features the story of a Norwegian pioneer family's struggles with the land and the elements of the Dakota Territory, as they try to make a new life in America. It was based partly upon Rolvaag's personal experiences as a settler and as well of the experiences of his wife's family who had been immigrant homesteaders. The novel realistically treats the lives and trials of Norwegian pioneers in the Midwest, emphasizing their battles with the elements. The book also portrays the trials of loneliness, separation from family, longing for the old country, and the difficulty of fitting into a new culture.

The book was written in Norwegian and then translated into English. The book reads as an American novel but stems from an Old World literary tradition. It provides dramatic contrast between Per Hansa and his wife, Beret.

Per is a natural pioneer who sees promise flooding the windswept plains. Beret hungers for the ways of her homeland, and in her heart, loneliness gathers and penetrates the deeper reality of life lived on the American frontier.

Giants in the Earth served as the basis for an opera by Douglas Moore and Arnold Sundgaard that won the Pulitzer Prize for Music in 1951.

Honors and awards
Rølvaag was appointed Knight of the Order of St Olav by King Haakon VII in 1926. Also, St. Olaf College has created a literary award named for Rolvaag, the Ole E. Rolvaag Award for Fiction, the "award honors the memory of St. Olaf’s greatest writer, Ole Rolvaag".

Memorials

The O. E. Rolvaag House in Northfield, Minnesota is listed as a National Historic Landmark.
Rolvaag Memorial Library  at St. Olaf College is named in honor of O. E. Rolvaag.
Berdahl–Rølvaag House, where Rølvaag wrote Giants in the Earth, is located in the Heritage Park of the Augustana University campus in Sioux Falls, South Dakota.
The Ole Rolvaag Collection is maintained in the Norwegian-American Historical Association Archives at St. Olaf College.

Selected bibliography
Amerika-breve fra P.A. Smevik til hans far og bror i Norge – American Letters (1912)
Paa Glemte Veie – On Forgotten Paths (1914)
To Tullinger: Et Billede frå idag – Two Fools: A Portrait of Our Times (1920)
Længselens Baat – The Boat of Longing (1921)
Omkring fædrearven – Concerning Our Heritage (1922)
I de Dage – In Those Days (1923)
Riket Grundlægges – Founding the Kingdom (1924)
The following three books form a trilogy:
Giants in the Earth (combined version of I de Dage and Riket Grundlægges – translated and published in 1927)
Peder Seier – Peder Victorious (translated in 1929)
Den Signede Dag – Their Father's God (translated in 1931)
Last release:
Pure Gold (translated in 1930)
The Boat of Longing (1933)

References

Additional sources
Jorgenson, Theodore and Solum, Nora O. Ole Edvart Rölvaag: A Biography (Harper and Brothers, 1939)
Reigstad, Paul. Rolvaag: His Life and Art (University of Nebraska Press, 1972)
Thorson, Gerald. Ole Rolvaag, Artist and Cultural Leader  (St. Olaf College Press, 1975)
Simonson, Harold P. Prairies Within: The Tragic Trilogy of Ole Rolvaag (University of Washington Press, 1987)
Moseley, Ann. Ole Edvart Rolvaag (Boise State University Bookstore, 1987)
Eckstein, Neil Truman. Marginal Man As Novelist: The Norwegian-American Writers H.H Boyesen and O.E. Rolvaag  (Taylor & Francis, 1990)
Haugen, Einar Ingvald  Ole Edvart Rölvaag	(Boston: Twayne Publishers,1983)
Moose, Nancy Gwen, Religion, Women and Culture in the Works of Ole E. Rølvaag. (1989). Electronic Theses and Dissertations. South Dakota State University. https://openprairie.sdstate.edu/etd/4610
Zempel, Solveig. 1999. Ole Edvart Rolvaag: Novelist. St. Olaf and the Vocation of a Church College, Pamela Schwandt, Gary De Krey, and L. DeAne Lagerquist, eds. pp. 89-96. Northfield, MN: St. Olaf College.

External links
Ole Rølvåg
Norwegian-American Historical Association - O.E. Rølvaag papers
Minnesota Historic Society – Minnesota Author Biographies Project
St Olaf College – Rolvaag Memorial Library
Two Novelists of the Northwest Prairie Frontier. (Texas Christian University Press, 1998.)
Rolvaag's Search for Soria Moria by Raychel A. Haugrud (Norwegian-American Historical Association. Volume 26: Page 103)
Dear Sara Alelia: An Episode in Rølvaag's Life by Einar Haugen (Norwegian-American Historical Association. Volume 31: Page 269)
The Social Criticism of Ole Edvart Rølvaag by Neil T. Eckstein (Norwegian-American Historical Association. Volume 24: Page 112) 
 Rølvaag’s Lost Novel by Einar Haugen (Norwegian-American Historical Association. Volume 32: Page 209) 
The Scandinavian Immigrant Writer in America by Dorothy Burton Skardal (Norwegian-American Historical Association. Volume 21: Page 14)

1876 births
1931 deaths
Norwegian emigrants to the United States
People from Dønna
20th-century American novelists
American Lutherans
American male novelists
20th-century Norwegian novelists
People from Northfield, Minnesota
People from Rice County, Minnesota
People from Union County, South Dakota
Writers from South Dakota
St. Olaf College faculty
Recipients of the St. Olav's Medal
20th-century American male writers
Novelists from Minnesota
St. Olaf College people